Jackson Hill may refer to:

Jackson Hill (composer), American composer
Jackson Hill, Indiana, an unincorporated settlement in the United States
Jackson Hill, Jersey City, a neighbourhood
Jackson Hill (Georgia), a summit in Georgia
Jackson Hill (Missouri), a summit in Missouri
Jackson Hill (Delaware County, New York), an elevation in Delaware County, New York
Jackson Hill (Oneida County, New York), an elevation in Oneida County, New York
Jackson Hill Park, a park in Cincinnati, Ohio, USA

See also
Mount Jackson (disambiguation)